Bruno Weber (10 April 1931 – 24 October 2011) was a Swiss artist and architect, specializing in fantastic realism.

Biography

Early life
Bruno Weber was born in 1931 in Dietikon, Switzerland. In 1947, he completed college in Zürich under Johannes Itten, the inventor of a "color sphere". Afterwards he began training until 1949 as a lithographer with Orell Fuessli (Zürich); later he studied in Italy, Greece and Czechoslovakia.

Career

Weber extended his Bruno Weber Park (a sculpture garden) in Spreitenbach and Dietikon, where among other things, his house with a 25m high tower is situated. The park extends over a surface of 20'000 m². The sculpture park is the synthesis of the artist's life work, and is visited annually by thousands of people. From 1991 to 2003 Weber was responsible for the sculptural decorations on the Uetliberg mountain, including the street lamps leading to the top of Zürich plateau (Uto Kulm) and park benches, that still exist.

Weber co-operated with Zürich architect Justus Dahinden, making sculptures for buildings in Dahinden, Vienna and Zürich.  

He discovered his passion for three-dimensional sculptures after thirty years of painting. On the basis of his paintings, development can be recognized contrary to his sculptures, which orients itself to Cézanne and Gubler. 

In 2006, the municipalities of Spreitenbach and Dietikon inaugurated a road – Bruno Weber Weg – leading from Dietikon railway station to the Bruno Weber Park.

Awards (excerpts) 
 1999–2001: Werkbeiträge Migros
 2006: Bruno Weber Weg

Literature 
 Hans-Ruedi Bramaz, edited by Stefan Howald, designed by Helen Ebert. With contributions by Franz Hohler, Fritz Billeter, Peter K. Wehrli, Roman Hocke, Helene Arnet, Peter Conrad, and a foreword by Christine Egerszegi-Obrist: Bruno Weber: Die Kraft der Phantasie. Ein Lebenswerk. Hirmer Verlag, Munich, . 
 Peter K. Wehrli, photographs by Robert Elter: Bruno Weber - Der Architekt seiner Träume. Benteli, 2002, .

References

External links

 Official site "Bruno Weber - A world full of fantasy"
 Entry of Bruner Webre in labyrinthe with extensive biographic information
 

1931 births
2011 deaths
Swiss architects
Swiss sculptors
Place of death missing
People from Dietikon District